Talamadla is a village located in the taluk of Kamareddy, mandal of Rajampet, district of Kamareddy, in the State of Telangana, India.

Villages in Kamareddy district